Candi Milo (born January 9, 1961) is an American actress. 

She has voiced various characters on many animated series including Tiny Toon Adventures, SWAT Kats: The Radical Squadron, Dexter's Laboratory (from season 3 onwards), Johnny Bravo, Cow and Chicken, ChalkZone, The Adventures of Jimmy Neutron, Boy Genius, ¡Mucha Lucha!, Codename: Kids Next Door, My Life as a Teenage Robot, Loonatics Unleashed, Foster's Home for Imaginary Friends, Maya & Miguel, W.I.T.C.H., The Life and Times of Juniper Lee, The Replacements, and The Adventures of Puss in Boots. Since 2017, she has voiced the Looney Tunes character Granny.

Early life and career
Milo was born on January 9, 1961, in Palm Springs, California. Her family moved to San Jose shortly after her birth. In San Jose, Milo attended the all-girls Presentation High School. Her father, Tony Migliaccio, was a child actor who changed his last name to Milo when he started playing adult roles. Her first appearance on stage was with her father at Turk Murphy's in 1964, where they sang Me and My Shadow together. By the time Milo was eleven, she was participating in children's musical theater.

In 1977, she began singing in theme park attractions, most notably at Disneyland in Anaheim. Afterwards, she started appearing in roles in movies and television series, such as Gimme a Break!, Knots Landing, and Perfect Strangers. Milo was also a member of "The Mighty Carson Art Players" on The Tonight Show with Johnny Carson. She accidentally got into voiceover acting after singing on stage. She was signed by The William Morris Agency for voice acting, which was initially disappointing to her because Milo originally wanted a singing career.

Milo's first voice role was Sweetie Pie in Tiny Toon Adventures in 1990. Milo first auditioned in 1988 for Tiny Toons by reading The Three Little Pigs, but made the wolf kosher and the three pigs suicidal and she booked the job. She later played Lonette, an attractive animated waitress; Bob, a member of Holli Would's gang of goons who was a cross-dresser and other characters in Cool World in addition to feeding lines to the other actors.

She went on to be very active in cartoons, voicing Pakka in Cro, Ann Gora in SWAT Kats: The Radical Squadron, Little Red Riding Hood in 2 Stupid Dogs, and the main characters' Mom, who was an unseen character and their teacher in Cow and Chicken.

Later, she replaced Christine Cavanaugh as the voice of Dexter in Dexter's Laboratory in 2001 when Cavanaugh retired from voice acting. Milo voiced Dexter until the end of the series. Her other voice credits include Snap from ChalkZone, The Flea on ¡Mucha Lucha! and the title character in the U.S. version of the 2003 Astro Boy (Tetsuwan Atomu) series.

From 2003 to 2009, she did the voice of Dr. Nora Wakeman in My Life as a Teenage Robot. For this role, she was subsequently nominated for the Annie Award in 2004 and 2005.
During this time, the actress also voiced the Ophelia Ramirez in The Life and Times of Juniper Lee, Irma Lair in W.I.T.C.H., Zadavia in Loonatics Unleashed, as well as Coco, Madame Foster and Cheese in Foster's Home for Imaginary Friends.

Milo says that when creating a unique voice the artist's drawings speak to her and that she prides herself on creating "a full life" for each character.

In October 2015, she made her return to the stage, playing the role of Grandmama Addams in the 3-D Theatricals version of The Addams Family.

In 2019, she directed Suicidal Blonde, which stars Kimmy Robertson.

Milo returned once again to stage in February 2020 with another 3-D Theatricals play called Kinky Boots, with her playing Trish.

Personal life
Milo is divorced and has one daughter, Gabriella, who is also an actress. She has described herself as being of partial Latin American descent.

Filmography

Television animation
 2 Stupid Dogs – Little Red Riding Hood, Mama Bear, Female Platypus
 Aaahh!!! Real Monsters – Additional Voices
 The Adventures of Jimmy Neutron, Boy Genius – Nick Dean, additional voices 
 Aladdin – Thundra
 All Grown Up! – Justin, Brianna, Amelia, Doctor, Cafeteria lady, Gawky Kid, Kid #3 (2)
 American Dragon: Jake Long – Annika
 The Angry Beavers – Tanya Goode
 Astro Boy (English dub) – Astro Boy, Kennedy
 As Told by Ginger – Claire Gripling, additional voices 
 Batman Beyond – Nicole (Ep. "Dead Man's Hand")
 Be Cool, Scooby-Doo – Ms. Tuckell (Ep. "There Wolf")
 Breadwinners – Roni (Ep. "Pizzawinners"), additional voices
 Blaze and the Monster Machines – Sister Cow, Little Cow
 Bobby's World - Tiffany, Amber, Andrea
 Bubble Guppies – Elderly Crab (Ep. "Come To Your Senses!"), additional voices
 The Buzz on Maggie – Chip, Mrs. Wingston, Nurse Hatchison, Mrs. Lunch Lady, Mrs. Flybottom
 The Boondocks - Janet O'Siren (Ep. "The Itis")
 Camp Candy – Robin (season 3)
 Captain Planet and the Planeteers – Betty Jean (Ep. "Going Bats, Man")
 ChalkZone – Snap, Reggie Bullnerd, Blocky 
 Chowder – Frog Lady, Chicken Lady, Rosemary, Big Food, Droopy Faced Lady, Eagle, Girl, Gyoza, Sexy Lady Voice, Rake, additional voices
 Clifford the Big Red Dog - Ms. Martinez
 Clifford's Puppy Days – Nina's Mother, Hester, Gray Puppy
 Codename: Kids Next Door – Henrietta Von Marzipan, Mrs. Betty Gilligan, Lydia (Grandma) Gilligan, Leaky Leona, Lasso Lass, Miss Goodwall, Edna Jucation, Heli-Teacher, Madam Margaret and one of the Girl Squad
 Cow and Chicken – Mom, Teacher, additional voices
 Cro – Pakka
 Curious George – Mrs. Quint, Mrs. Donuts
 Darkwing Duck – Duck Ling, Lamont, Additional voices
 Detention - Juliana (Ep. "Capitol Punishment")
 Dexter's Laboratory – Dexter (Seasons 3–4), additional voices
 Duck Dodgers – Rikki Roundhouse (Ep. "The Menace of Maninsuit")
 El Tigre: The Adventures of Manny Rivera – Zoe Aves/Black Cuervo, additional voices
 Fanboy & Chum Chum – Lupe, Cher Leader, Madame LaVache, Ms. Olive, Francine, Lunch Lady Cram and Marsha
 Fillmore! – Receptionist 
 Foster's Home for Imaginary Friends – Madame Foster, Coco, Cheese, Crackers, Additional Voices
 Gary & Mike – Francine (The Mole Woman), Sister Marie, Wendy's Grandma, Grade School Teacher, Corn Dog Waitress, Vanessa Wexler, Additional Voices
 Glitch Techs – Kids, Brother, Little Contestant, Lupita 
 Hey Arnold! – Charice, Parrot
 I Am Weasel – Additional voices
 Invader Zim - additional voices
 Jakers! – Gosford
 Johnny Bravo – Helga (Ep. "To Helga and Back"), additional voices
 Kulipari: An Army of Frogs – Dingo, The Stargazer, Fahlga
 LeapFrog Video Series - Leap (4 DVDs)
 Loonatics Unleashed – Zadavia, additional voices 
 Los Lunnis – Lupita (English dub)
 Looney Tunes Cartoons - Granny
 Max Steel - Female Surfer, Kelly Gear, Young Fan, Secretary
 Maya & Miguel – Maya Santos, Tito Chavez
 Me, Eloise – Margarita, Bruce, Bobby, Emmy, Tutor Candidate #1, Betty
 Mighty Magiswords – Morbidia ("Too Many Warriors" only), Vambre's Brain, Dolphin Magisword (EP02 only), Grand Poobah, Additional voices
 Mirmo! – Bike
 ¡Mucha Lucha! – The Flea, Pulgita, The Headmistress, Rikochet's Mom, La Flamencita Electricity,, Cindy Slam (Season 3), Various characters
 My Life as a Teenage Robot – Ms. Nora Wakeman, Pteresa, Additional Voices
 New Looney Tunes – Granny, Witch Hazel, Ivana, Bear Scout, Phoebe, Weasel Scout
 OK K.O.! Let's Be Heroes - Combo Breaker, Kid Girl #1
 Oh Yeah! Cartoons - Tutu, Baxter, Additional voices
 Ozzy & Drix – Mumsy Glop (Ep. "A Growing Cell")
 Pepper Ann – Constance Goldman
 Pet Alien – Gabby, Tommy's Mom, Melba
 Phineas and Ferb - Ducky Momo Kiosk Girl, Additional voices
 Pig Goat Banana Cricket – Goat, additional voices 
 Pinky and the Brain/Pinky, Elmyra & the Brain – Additional voices
 Planet Sheen – Princess OomLout, additional voices 
 Puss in Book: Trapped in an Epic Tale – Kid Pickles, Cleevil, Mama Bear 
 Random! Cartoons – Yumi, Octopus, Nurse Duckett, Bee
 Rise of the Teenage Mutant Ninja Turtles - Carly Balmaceda, Mother, Reporter, Girl 1 
 Santo Bugito – Mother Bug, Rose
 Spy Kids: Mission Critical - Vida Immortata, Malware, Mauly the Sparkle Scout, Glendora Chatting-Botham
 Stanley – Ms. Diaz
 SWAT Kats: The Radical Squadron – Ann Gora
 T.U.F.F. Puppy – The Queen, Lunch Ladybug, Classmate # 1
 The Adventures of Kid Danger - Mrs. Elliot, Female Mailman, Marla Meadows, Zombie, Lana, Witches
 The Adventures of Puss in Boots - Kid Pickles, Cleevil, Orange, Doozill, Luella, additional voices 
 The Angry Beavers - Tanya Goode
 The Cartoonstitute - Po
 The Cuphead Show! - Cherry and Brandywine Heirloom
 The Emperor's New School – Coach Sweetie, Yzma
 The Grim Adventures of Billy & Mandy – Grim's Mom
 The Legend of Calamity Jane – Zita
 The Life and Times of Juniper Lee – Ophelia Ramírez, Barbara Lee, Ms Gomez 
 The Looney Tunes Show – Svetlana (Ep. "Fish and Visitors")
 The Mummy: Secrets of the Medjai – Tiga (Ep. "The Cloud People")
 The New Woody Woodpecker Show – Teany
 The Plucky Duck Show – Sweetie Pie
 The Powerpuff Girls - Newswoman (1), Cleaning Woman
 The Replacements – Amanda McMurphy, Jacobo, Heidi Klutzberry, Mrs. Winters   
 The Secret Saturdays – Dr. Pachacutes, Arab Reporter
 The Tick – Blitzen (Ep. "Tick vs Europe")
 The Wild Thornberrys – Additional voices
 The 7D - Baroness Bon Bon 
 Time Squad - Dexter
 Tiny Toon Adventures – Sweetie Pie
 TripTank - Old Aboriginal Woman, Sandra, Sir Ian's Kids, Gladys, Nurse (2)
 W.I.T.C.H. – Irma Lair, Anna Lair, Trill, Principal Knickerbocker
 What A Cartoon Show – Cow and Chicken's Mom, Mary Antelope, Effie Gorilla, Jill Gorilla, Timmy, Teacher, Female Eskimo, Stewardess, Poopsie
 What-a-Mess – Ramona
 Where on Earth Is Carmen Sandiego? – Additional voices
 Where's Waldo? – Chili Judge / Grandmother
 WordGirl - WordGirl/Becky Botsford (WordGirl Website on PBSKids.org)

Animated films

 A Hollywood Hounds Christmas – Rosie
 Mucha Lucha: The Return of El Malefico – The Flea, The Headmistress, Ricochet's Mom

Live-action film
 Almost an Angel – Bank Teller
 At Home with the Webbers – 2nd Woman on Street
 Bad Medicine – Maria Morales
 I Don't Buy Kisses Anymore – Mother in Store
 Reaching for the Stars – Herself
 Ripper Man – Francie
 When Jeff Tried To Save The World – Sheila
 Creepshow 3 – Rachel

Live-action television
 Amero Squad – Flemma, Destroyer of Pyramid (Female Version of Fladdam)
 City Guys – Rude Customer (Ep. "Rosie O'Diner")
 Days of Our Lives – Janey Richards
 Doogie Howser, MD – Doctor (Ep. "It's a Tough Job ... But Why Does My Father Have to Do It?")
 Empty Nest – Mrs. Ortiz (Ep. "Love and Marriage")
 Gimme a Break! – Leslie (Ep. "Flashback")
 Knots Landing – Nurse (Ep. "The One to Blame" and "The Fan Club")
 Night Court – Woman (Ep. "Can't Buy Me Love")
 Perfect Strangers – Gina Morelli (Ep. "Hello, Baby" and "The Two Men and a Cradle"
 Wilfred – Secretary (Ep. "Regrets")

Video games
 Astro Boy – Astro Boy
 Baten Kaitos Origins – Almarde
Cartoon Network Racing - Dexter
 Cartoon Network Universe: FusionFall – Dexter, Coco, Cheese
 Dissidia Final Fantasy – Shantotto
 Dissidia 012 Final Fantasy – Shantotto
 Dissidia Final Fantasy NT – Shantotto
 Final Fantasy X – Dona
 Final Fantasy X-2 – Dona, Lucil
 Final Fantasy XIII – Additional Voices
 Final Fantasy XV – Leviathan
 Resonance of Fate – Additional Voices
 Rugrats: Royal Ransom – Chuckie
 SpongeBob SquarePants featuring Nicktoons: Globs of Doom – Ms. Bitters (replacing Lucille Bliss)
 Tomodachi Life – Tomoko
 Valkyria Chronicles – Additional voices (as Candy Milo)
 World of Final Fantasy – Shantotto

Theater
 Twelfth Night – Maria
 Life's Too Short – One-Woman Show
 Hip is a Relative Term – One-Woman Show
 Dreamgirls – Ensemble Soloist
 To Sir, With Love – Baby
 Mamma Mia – Rosie
 Funny Business – Ensemble
 Just for Laughs Festival – Stand Up Comedienne
 The Addams Family – Grandmama Addams
 9 to 5 – Roz
 Kinky Boots - Trish

Theme parks
 The Amazing Adventures of Spider-Man'' - Scream

References

External links
 
 Interview with Candi: Part 1, Part 2
 Candi Milo's blog

1961 births
Living people
Actresses from Los Angeles
Actresses from San Jose, California
American child actresses
American film actresses
American impressionists (entertainers)
American musical theatre actresses
American musicians of Mexican descent
American television actresses
American video game actresses
American voice actresses
Cartoon Network people
Comedians from California
20th-century American actresses
21st-century American actresses
20th-century American comedians
21st-century American comedians
Hispanic and Latino American actresses
American actresses of Mexican descent